Philosophy-Neuroscience-Psychology (PNP) is an interdisciplinary program at Washington University in St. Louis which allows students to examine the mind and cognition from multiple perspectives.  This program is available to both undergraduates  (as a minor, major or second major) as well as graduate students (as a PhD track within philosophy).

Undergraduate Program
Within the PNP program undergraduates students are able to choose between Cognitive Neuroscience (CN) track, examining "the study of higher brain functioning with behavioral research directed at understanding activities such as perceiving, attending, remembering, and acting" or the Language, Cognition and Culture (LCC) track, looking at "the importance of language in human cognition, and the integration of cognition with one's cultural environment".

Graduate Program
The PNP graduate program is a track within the PhD of philosophy that emphasizes knowledge of state of the art work in cognitive science and neuroscience.   The current program is twelve students in size.

References

External links 
 PNP program information 

Academic programs in cognitive science